Jonathan "Johnny" Meres (born in 1958) is an English actor and writer of children and teen novels.

Awards

"Scottish Children's Book Award 20

"Phoenix Book Award 2013"

"Perrier Comedy Award" nominee 1993

"Time Out" Award winner 1989

Filmography

Books by Meres 
 World of Norm 11 - May Be Recycled (2016)
 World of Norm 10 - Includes Delivery (2016)
 World of Norm 09 - May Still Be Charged (2015)
 World of Norm 08 - May Contain Buts (2015)
 World of Norm 07 - Must Be Washed Separately (2014)
 World of Norm 06 - May Need Rebooting (2014)
 World of Norm 05 - May Be Contagious (2013)
 World of Norm 04 - May Require Batteries (June 2013)
 World of Norm 03 - May Produce Gas (2012)
 World of Norm 02 - May Cause Irritation (2012)
 World of Norm 01 - May Contain Nuts (2011) Winner of the Scottish Children's Book Award 2012
 The World of Norm (Activity Book) - May Need Filling In (2014)
 Phenomenal! - The Small Book Of Big Words (2012)
 Koala Calamity (2012)
 The XMAS Factor (2012)
 Our City (2008)
 On The Money (2007)
 Diary of a Trainee Rock God (2006)
 Fame Thing (2006)
 Love Dad (2004)
 Yo! Dot UK (2001)
 Clone Zone (2001)
 The Big Bad Rumour (2000)
 Yo! Diary! 2 - and another thing (2000)
 Yo! Diary! (1999)
 Somewhere Out There (1998)

Official Website

References 

Official Website

External links 
 

1958 births
English male film actors
English male television actors
21st-century English novelists
Living people
Writers from Nottingham
English male novelists
21st-century English male writers